Events in the year 1535 in Norway.

Incumbents
Monarch: Interregnum (Olav Engelbrektsson as Regent)

Events

 Spring - The southern branch of the Norwegian riksråd elects Christian III of Denmark as king of Norway. The northern branch refuse to accept the election. The privy councils leader Olav Engelbrektsson wants Frederick the Wise as king.
 July 21 - Nils Lykke is convicted for incest and is executed later the same year.

Arts and literature

Births

Deaths
30 May – Olav Torkelsson, Roman Catholic bishop.
24 December – Nils Lykke, nobleman.

Full date missing 
Anders Mus, bishop.

References